Curtola may refer to:

 Bobby Curtola (1943–2016), Canadian singer and teen idol

Curtola Park & Ride, a bus station in Vallejo, California
 Curtola Parkway, a stretch of Interstate 780, California